Cameron Lewis Moir-Pring (born 22 January 1998) is an English professional footballer who plays as a left back for Bristol City.

Career
Born in Cheltenham, Pring began his career with his hometown club Cheltenham Town, joining their youth academy as a 14-year-old in 2012. In January 2016 he moved to Bristol City.

In January 2017, Pring moved to Guernsey on a youth loan, making 4 appearances in the Isthmian League Division One South. He then spent further loan spells at Merthyr Town, Aldershot Town and Hereford during the 2017–18 season.

He moved on loan to Newport County in August 2018. He made his debut for Newport on 11 September 2018 against Swindon Town in a 1–0 EFL Trophy defeat, and on 17 November 2018 he scored his first senior goal in a 2–0 win against Colchester United. He returned to hometown club Cheltenham Town on loan in January 2019 until the end of the 2018–19 season.

On 3 July 2019, Pring signed for League Two side Walsall on a season-long loan deal.

On 1 September 2020 he moved on loan to Portsmouth for the 2020–21 season. However, this loan spell was cut short and he returned to his parent club in early January 2021.

Career statistics

References

External links

1998 births
Living people
English footballers
Cheltenham Town F.C. players
Bristol City F.C. players
Guernsey F.C. players
Merthyr Town F.C. players
Aldershot Town F.C. players
Hereford F.C. players
Newport County A.F.C. players
Walsall F.C. players
Portsmouth F.C. players
Association football fullbacks
Isthmian League players
Southern Football League players
National League (English football) players
English Football League players